Romania competed at the 2022 World Aquatics Championships in Budapest, Hungary from 17 June to 3 July.

Medalists

Diving

Romania entered two divers.

Men

Women

Swimming

Romania entered two swimmers..

Men

References

World Aquatics Championships
Nations at the 2022 World Aquatics Championships
2022